Read/write may refer to:

File system permissions
Read–write memory